Kultuurikatel aka Tallinn Creative Hub is a non-profit foundation and cultural organisation in Tallinn, Estonia situated in the Tallinn Power Plant and a medium between international culture, creative industry and private sector.
Kultuurikatel organises events, workshops, performances. Yearly it organises Stalker Festival and is a partner in the Tallinn Music Week.

The organisation also runs an active artist-in-residence program to serve professional artists from different fields of culture. The organisation has several departments such as a sound lab, a maker lab, a digital and audio-visual lab, Toidulabor/a food lab. Tallinn Creative Hub is a member of international networks such as ECOC (European Capitals of Culture), ENCATC (European Network on Cultural Management and Cultural Policy), ECBN (European Creative Business Network), Circostrada and Estonian Chamber of Service Industry.

Kultuurikatel is located at the complex of the former Tallinn Power Plant.

External links

Culture in Tallinn
Music venues in Estonia
New media art
Buildings and structures in Tallinn